Ana María Arroyo Mariscal (31 July 1923 – 28 March 1995) better known as Ana Mariscal was a classic Spanish film actress, director, screenwriter and film producer. She also acted in Argentinean films. She was involved in well over 50 films between 1940 and 1968, frequently starring in films she also wrote and directed. She is iconic to 1940s and 50s Spanish cinema. Her brother Luis Arroyo (1915–1956) was also an actor and film director.

Early life and education 
Mariscal was born in Madrid in 1923 to a middle-class family. Her father owned a furniture store and a theater that would provide Mariscal much of her early exposure to acting. While occasionally appearing in theater productions with her brother, Mariscal intended to go to university to study mathematics. She decided to pursue acting after being incidentally cast in her first film role.

Career 
Ana Mariscal began her career after accompanying her actor brother Luis Arroyo to an audition for El Ultimo Husar. Almost by chance, she was noticed by the director Luis Marquina and cast in the film. This would start a prolific career in acting and directing.

Over the next decade, Mariscal starred in over 20 films, becoming a household name in Spain. A few notable films from this time include The Queen's Flower Girl, Raza, A Shadow at the Window, and The Princess of the Ursines. After a decade of typecast roles, Mariscal started her own production company called BOSCO and begin writing and directing her own works. She made her directorial debut with Segundo Lopez, a film she also wrote and starred in. It was a critically well-received comedy with Italian Neo-realist influences. She later directed her esteemed work They fired with their lives that deals with the Spanish Civil War; an event Mariscal herself lived through during her childhood.

In her later career, she shifted among film, television, and theater pursuits, still using her production company to fund her projects. During this period, she directed or became involved with Occidente y sabotaje, El Camino, and The Other Woman. She began teaching classes at the IIEC (Institute of Investigations and Cinematographic Experiences) while still balancing acting and directing jobs. She eventually receded from the world of film making and dedicate her time entirely to the study of literature.

Just a few months before her death, she received the gold medal for Merit in the Fine Arts in 1995. She is buried in the Cementerio de la Almudena

Filmography

Awards

Further reading 
 Victoria, Fonseca, [2002]. Ana Mariscal : una cineasta pionera. [Madrid]: EGEDA. . OCLC 432886850.

References

External links 
 

1923 births
1995 deaths
Actresses from Madrid
Expatriate actresses in Argentina
Spanish film actresses
Spanish film producers
Spanish film directors
Spanish women film directors
20th-century Spanish actresses
Spanish women screenwriters
20th-century screenwriters